The Ministry of Education, Culture, Research, and Technology is a government ministry of the Indonesian government responsible for education, cultural, research and technology affairs. Its formation resulted from the merger of the Ministry of Education and Culture and the Ministry of Research and Technology in April 2021, under the government of President Joko Widodo.

History

Formation 

On 30 March 2021, President Joko Widodo submitted a Presidential Letter to People's Representative Council, which contained a proposal for major changes in the national cabinet, one of which was the merger of the Ministry of Research and Technology and the Ministry of Education and Culture into one ministry named Ministry of Education, Culture, Research, and Technology. The National Research and Innovation Agency (Indonesian: Badan Riset dan Inovasi Nasional, abbreviated BRIN) were to be separated as a new non-ministerial agency.

On 9 April 2021, People's Representative Council approved the proposal, along with the creation of the new Ministry of Investment. On 13 April 2021, Ali Mochtar Ngabalin, spokesperson for and specialist of the Presidential Staff Office, announced that a second reshuffle of the Onward Indonesia Cabinet will take place on second week of April 2021. The reshuffle was finally announced at 28 April 2021. It was the first of its kind, because not only were the ministers reshuffled, but cabinet institutions were also disbanded mid-term. In this reshuffle, Nadiem Makarim was appointed as the first Minister of Education, Culture, Research, and Technology, according to the Presidential Decision No. 72/P/2021. On the same day, the President formally recognized the ministry as one of the 34 Indonesian government ministries.

On 30 July 2021, President Widodo issued the permanent constituting document of the ministry, Presidential Decree No. 62/2021. The decree itself backdated to 15 July 2021.

Reception 
General secretary of the Indonesian Democratic Party of Struggle Hasto Kristiyanto praised the move. With the merger, he hoped that the now independent BRIN would play an important role in accelerating the growth of research in Indonesia. The Deputy Chief of Commission X in the People's Representative Council, Hetifah Syaifudian of Golkar, also praised the move. She commented that such fusion might helping the research synergy between academia and research agencies.

Criticism 
Deputy chief of the Prosperous Justice Party fraction in the People's Representative Council Mulyanto from the opposition criticized the decision taken by government and said that the change is not effective. He claimed that government not learned from the previous experience when combining Ministry of Research and Technology with General Directorate of Higher Education to form Ministry of Research, Technology, and Higher Education. While the ministry was successfully formed, Mulyanto claimed that the ministry was not effective when combined to manage research and technology development and educational affairs. He also cited that in previous cabinet, the administrative migration and adaptation processes in a new ministry required at least three years. Not only that, the presence of the non-ministerial National Research and Innovation Agency to coordinate and facilitate state research and development, would result in an overlap with some of the tasks of the ministry.

The governing coalition also voiced criticisms. While the Chief of Commission X in the People's Representative Council, Syaiful Huda of the National Awakening Party praised the move, he criticized the timing of the formation of the new ministry, happening in the middle of the second term of the ruling government, when normally such a major change would have been done earlier. Citing the issue of lengthy administrative migration and adaptation processes, Huda urged that the transitional process must be done as soon as possible, in a maximum time of one year after the formation of the new ministry, stressing the importance of research during the COVID-19 pandemic. He also commented that such a merger will put heavy load to the new ministry because both of preceding ministries had very different focuses.

In the aftermath of the release of the Presidential Decree No. 62/2021, the formation of the General Directorate of Higher Education, Research, and Technology was also criticized by officials of the ministry. An official from the Quality Control Department, Johannes Gunawan, criticized the government for not learning from failures of the past, citing past mismanagement of expert personnel.

2022 Curriculum Reform 
In 2022, the ministry-initiated curriculum policy options as part of efforts to mitigate learning loss and as a form of learning recovery. The ministry provides three options for educational units to implement a curriculum based on the National Education Standards that is in accordance with the learning needs and context of each educational unit. The three options are as follows:
 using the 2013 Curriculum completely
 using the Emergency Curriculum
 using the Independence Curriculum
The ministry launched Independence Curriculum as part of learning activities recovery process. The curriculum designed to be more flexible, focused on essential material, and develop student's characters and competence. The main characteristics of this curriculum that support learning recovery are: 
 Project-based learning for soft skills and character development according to the profile of Pancasila students
 Focus on essential material so that there is sufficient time for in-depth study of basic competencies such as literacy and numeracy.
 Flexibility for teachers to carry out differentiated learning according to the abilities of students and make adjustments to local contexts and content.

Organizational structure 
The minister of education, culture, research, and technology, appointed by the president at his own discretion, is by Presidential Decree No. 62 of 2021. The head of the Ministry of Education, Culture, Research, and Technology, under and responsible to the president. The decree also created the Office of Deputy Minister of Education, Culture, Research, and Technology, though it is currently vacant. 
Initially, the organizational structure of the ministry was a direct merger of the structures of the two preceding cabinet ministries. However, the structure was deemed too large and ineffective.   

On 23 August 2021, the structure of the Ministry was expanded by Ministerial Decree No. 28/2021 into:

A smaller version of the Ministry of Research and Technology, the General Directorate of Higher Education, Research, and Technology, was created within the ministry in pursuance of Presidential Decree No. 62/2021, to govern and regulate science, research, and technology in Indonesia after dismantlement of Ministry of Research and Technology. Despite that, the coordination between the ministry and the National Research and Innovation Agency (BRIN) was not yet made clear in the constituting document. Minister Nadiem Makarim asserted that BRIN is a partner of the ministry in performing researches, and not a subordinate of the ministry. While the presidential decree did not clearly separate the scope of the limitation of the ministry and coordination with BRIN, the Ministerial Decree No. 28/2021 distinguished BRIN as a separate entity and clearly outlined the ministry's power in regulating scientific, research, and technology affairs, confirming Makarim's statement. The ministerial decree also confirmed the relinquishment of its National Archaeology Research Institute to BRIN.

As overseer of science, research, and technology in Indonesia, the Ministry has roles to oversee and preparing regulations and technical policies of science, research, and technology. Despite overseer rule, Ministry of Education, Culture, Research, and Technology also have research functions, but only limited to academic research. State research and development activities, non-academic governmental strategic research, and policy research are performed by BRIN.

2022 Shadow Organization Disclosure 
Unlike other ministries in Indonesia, Ministry of Education, Culture, Research, and Technology possessed a shadow organization outside the structure which quite large in size which play significant role in ministry policies and outputs. The shadow organization presence was disclosed in September 2022. The organization is described as "unusual and abnormal" with around 400 members, comparable to size of a General Directorate of a ministry, from product managers, data scientists, and software engineers background. The shadow organization performed some extent of research and development activities on behalf of the Ministry. The presence of the organization surprised many Indonesians, as for the first time in Indonesian politics a shadow organization used by a ministry. For the disclosure, Nadiem confirmed the existence of the shadow organization and the shadow organization actually a legal tenderized collaboration between the ministry with GovTech Edu, a state-owned company subsidiary of Telkom. Such move criticized by People's Representative Council, and mass organizations advocating teachers' welfare and education. Critics criticized that such move is "wasteful" and "disrespectful" towards thousands original human resources employed by the ministry.

List of ministers

See also 

 Cabinet of Indonesia
List of government ministries of Indonesia

References 

Education, Culture, Research and Technology
Indonesia
Indonesia
Indonesia
Central Jakarta
Government agencies established in 2021
2021 establishments in Indonesia